Jacques Mailhot (born December 5, 1961) is a Canadian former professional ice hockey player who played five games in the National Hockey League (NHL) with the Quebec Nordiques during the 1988–89 season. The rest of his career, which lasted from 1987 to 2000, was spent in various minor leagues.

Career statistics

Regular season and playoffs

External links 
 

1961 births
Living people
Baltimore Skipjacks players
Canadian ice hockey right wingers
Cape Breton Oilers players
Central Texas Stampede players
Detroit Falcons (CoHL) players
Flint Bulldogs players
Fredericton Express players
Fresno Falcons players
Halifax Citadels players
Hampton Roads Admirals players
Ice hockey people from Quebec
Johnstown Chiefs players
Moncton Hawks players
Phoenix Roadrunners (IHL) players
Portland Rage players
Quad City Mallards (CoHL) players
Quebec Nordiques players
Rochester Americans players
San Diego Gulls (IHL) players
Sportspeople from Shawinigan
Undrafted National Hockey League players
Utah Grizzlies (IHL) players